Escapade is a 1936 German romantic comedy film directed by Erich Waschneck and starring Renate Müller, Georg Alexander and Grethe Weiser. It was shot at the Halensee Studios in Berlin. The film's sets were designed by the art directors Otto Erdmann and Hans Sohnle. It is based on the 1891 novel My Official Wife by Richard Henry Savage.

Cast
 Renate Müller as Madame Hélène
 Georg Alexander as Arthur Lenox
 Grethe Weiser as Hélène Lenox
 Walter Franck as Rakowsky - Chef der russ. Geheimpolizei
 Martha von Konssatzki as Fürstin Palitzin
 Franz Zimmermann as Sascha - ihr Neffe
 Paula Denk as Vera - seine Braut
 Paul Otto as Großfürst Ignatieff
 Harald Paulsen as Ossip Kaschejeff
 Reinhold Bernt as Prowiak, ein Friseur
 Harry Hardt as Woidetzki - Chef des Modesalons Brétonne
 Ernst Rotmund as von Podamsky
 Heinz Wemper as Suboff, Argent der Geheimpolizei
 Margarete Kupfer as Eine alte Dame
 Rudolf Biebrach
 Angelo Ferrari
 Erich Fiedler
 Bernhard Goetzke
 Jochen Hauer
 Agnes Kraus as Manja
 Otto Kronburger
 Herbert Spalke
 Arnim Suessenguth
 Bruno Ziener
 Sabine Ress as Ballett
 Alexander von Swaine as Solotänzer
 Alice Uhlen as Solotänzerin
 Ernst Rater

References

Bibliography

External links 
 

1936 films
1936 romantic comedy films
1930s spy comedy films
Films of Nazi Germany
German romantic comedy films
German spy comedy films
1930s German-language films
Films directed by Erich Waschneck
Films set in Poland
Films set in Russia
Films set in the 1910s
Films based on American novels
Tobis Film films
1930s German films
Films shot at Halensee Studios